The North America Cup is an annual harness racing event for 3-year-old standardbred pacing horses which is held at Woodbine Mohawk Park in Campbellville, Ontario, Canada. The race replaced the Queen City Pace run from 1964 to 1983. From 1984 to 1993, the North America Cup was held at Greenwood Raceway and from 1994 to 2006, the North America Cup was held at Woodbine Entertainment Group's other harness racing venue, Woodbine Racetrack. It is the richest harness race in North America at $1,000,000.

Records
 Most wins by a driver
 6 – John Campbell (1991, 1994, 1995, 1996, 1997, 1999)

 Most wins by a trainer
 3 – William G. Robinson (1993, 1994, 2002)

 Stakes record
 1:47 2/5 – Captain Crunch (2019)

North America Cup winners

References

Recurring sporting events established in 1984
Harness races in Canada
Mohawk Racetrack
1984 establishments in Ontario